Ptilostomis angustipennis is a species of giant casemaker in the family Phryganeidae. It is found in North America.

References

Trichoptera
Articles created by Qbugbot
Insects described in 1873